San Clemente, officially the Municipality of San Clemente, is a 5th class municipality in the province of Tarlac, Philippines. According to the 2020 census, it has a population of 13,181 people.

Geography
San Clemente borders the provinces of Pangasinan to the north and northwest and Zambales to the west. Like Santa Ignacia and Mayantoc, it is a former part of Camiling.

Barangays
San Clemente is politically subdivided into 12 barangays.

 Balloc
 Bamban 
 Casipo 
 Catagudingan 
 Daldalayap 
 Doclong 1 
 Doclong 2 
 Maasin 
 Nagsabaran 
 Pit-ao 
 Poblacion Norte 
 Poblacion Sur

Climate

Demographics

Economy

Tourism
 San Clemente Municipal Hall
 Saint Jude Thaddeus Parish Church of San Clemente
 Canding Falls
 Ubod Falls
 San Clemente Food Park

Gallery

References

External links

San Clemente Profile at PhilAtlas.com
[ Philippine Standard Geographic Code]
Philippine Census Information

Municipalities of Tarlac